The 12830 / 29 Bhubaneswar–Chennai Central Express is a Superfast Express train belonging to Indian Railways – East Coast Railway zone that runs between  and  in India. Initially it was running between Visakhapatnam to Chennai later snatched by East Coast Railway to Bhubaneswar by extending it. It recently runs with modern LHB coaches.

It operates as train number 12829 from Chennai Central to Bhubaneswar and as train number 12830 in the reverse direction, serving the states of Odisha, Andhra Pradesh & Tamil Nadu.

Coaches

The 12830 / 29 Bhubaneswar–Chennai Central Express presently has 1 AC 2 tier, 4 AC 3 tier, 11 Sleeper class, 4 Second Class seating & 2 EOG coaches. In addition, it carries a pantry car.

As with most train services in India, coach composition may be amended at the discretion of Indian Railways depending on demand.

Service

The 12829 Chennai Central–Bhubaneswar Express covers the distance of 1223 kilometres in 20 hours 25 mins (59.90 km/hr) & in 20 hrs 55 mins as 12830 Bhubaneswar–Chennai Central Express (58.47 km/hr).

As the average speed of the train is above 55 km/hr, as per Indian Railways rules, its fare includes a Superfast surcharge.

Routeing

It reverses direction of travel at Visakhapatnam Junction.

Traction

As the route is fully electrified, it is hauled end to end by an Arakkonam-based WAM-4 locomotive.

Timings

12830 Bhubaneswar–Chennai Central Express leaves Bhubaneswar every Thursday at 12:00 hrs IST and reaches Chennai Central at 08:55 hrs IST the next day.

12829 Chennai Central–Bhubaneswar Express leaves Chennai Central every Friday at 21:10 hrs IST and reaches Bhubaneswar at 17:35 hrs IST the next day.

References

External links

Transport in Bhubaneswar
Transport in Chennai
Express trains in India
Rail transport in Tamil Nadu
Rail transport in Andhra Pradesh
Rail transport in Odisha